The 1907–08 United States collegiate men's ice hockey season was the 14th season of collegiate ice hockey.

Regular season

Standings

References

1907–08 NCAA Standings

External links
College Hockey Historical Archives

 
College